Spyridium gunnii is a species of flowering plant in the family Rhamnaceae and is endemic to Tasmania. The heads of flowers are arranged in cymes surrounded by 2, 3 or more floral leaves.

The species was first formally described in 1863 by George Bentham in Flora Australiensis, from specimens collected by Ronald Campbell Gunn on the banks of the Franklin River near Macquarie Harbour. 

Spyridium gunnii grows near the west coast and in the western mountains of Tasmania.

References

gunnii
Flora of Tasmania
Taxa named by George Bentham
Plants described in 1863